Jason Chen (Pha̍k-fa-sṳ: Chhîn Yi-thûng, born November 12, 1988) is a Taiwanese-American pop singer. He began as a singer performing covers on YouTube, where he gained a sizable following. As of April 17, 2020, his YouTube channel, MusicNeverSleeps, has approximately 1.96 million subscribers. Since 2010, Chen has released dozens of singles and four full albums.

Early life
Chen was born in Boston, Massachusetts to Taiwanese parents but soon moved to Arcadia, California, when he was a few months old.  He attended UCLA in 2006 and graduated in 2010 with a BA in Economics. Although he grew up in the United States, he can also speak fluently in another language, Mandarin; thus, he is able to easily communicate to his fans in Taiwan through his secondary channel – JasonChenAsia. Furthermore, Chen's mother is a piano teacher, so he had the advantage of growing up under the influence of music and was given opportunities to learn many different instruments, such as the piano, the guitar, and the violin. Chen discovered his vocal talent at the age of 18 when he was planning a proposal to his high school crush. After graduating from UCLA, he became an accountant for about a year, but later decided to mainly focus on producing music.

Career
Chen started his musical career in 2007, during his second year as an undergraduate student at University of California, Los Angeles. His initial works included performing covers of songs by various renowned artists on YouTube, and as he became more experienced, he began producing and performing original music of his own.

In 2011, he released his first album, Gravity, and the single "Best Friend", which now has over thirty two million views. He has also performed in various countries such as Australia, Canada, China, Indonesia, Italy, Malaysia, Singapore, and Taiwan, as well as throughout the United States. Although Jason did not receive positive response initially, he started to gain more popularity in 2010.

Encouraged by the rise of his popularity, Chen released his first original album, “Gravity”. Later, he released his second and third original album “Never for Nothing” and "What If Acoustic" in 2013.

In 2014, Chen performed on the main stage at California food festival 626 Night Market.

Discography
Gravity – 2011
Jie Sheng Qian (Taiwanese cover album) – February 2013
Never for Nothing – April 2013 
What If – November 2013
Glass Heart – December 2014

References

External links
Official Facebook

1988 births
American people of Taiwanese descent
21st-century Taiwanese male singers
Taiwanese pop singers
American neo soul singers
Living people
21st-century American male singers
21st-century American singers
University of California, Los Angeles alumni